The 2006 WNBA season was the ninth for the Detroit Shock. The Shock won the WNBA Finals for the second time in franchise history.

Offseason

WNBA Draft

Regular season

Season standings

Season Schedule

Player stats
Note: GP= Games played; FG = Field Goals; MIN= Minutes; REB= Rebounds; AST= Assists; STL = Steals; BLK = Blocks; PTS = Points

Playoffs

|-
!colspan=12 style="text-align: center; background:#005DAA"|2006 WNBA Playoffs|[[2006 WNBA Finals]]

Awards and honors
 Cheryl Ford, WNBA Peak Performer
 Deanna Nolan, WNBA Finals MVP Award
 Katie Smith, Named to WNBA All-Decade Team

References

External links 
Shock on Basketball Reference

Detroit Shock seasons
Detroit
Detroit Shock
Eastern Conference (WNBA) championship seasons
Women's National Basketball Association championship seasons